The Spruce River is a  tributary of the Michigamme River on the Upper Peninsula of Michigan in the United States. Via the Michigamme River and the Menominee River, it is a tributary of Lake Michigan.

See also
List of rivers of Michigan

References

Michigan  Streamflow Data from the USGS

Rivers of Michigan
Tributaries of Lake Michigan